Láz is a municipality and village in Třebíč District in the Vysočina Region of the Czech Republic. It has about 300 inhabitants.

Geography
It lies in an agricultural landscape in the Jevišovice Uplands. Hájský Pond is situated in the eastern part of the municipality.

History
The first written mention of Láz is from 1498.

Demographics

Sights
The most valuable landmark is a wooden belfry from the early 19th century.

References

External links

Villages in Třebíč District